Waterhouses railways station may refer to
 Waterhouses (County Durham) railway station
 Waterhouses (Staffordshire) railway station